Rambeh (also known as Qal‘eh-i-Rumbeh, Qal‘eh-i-Rumbsh, Qal‘eh-ye Rūmbeh) is a village in Qaryah ol Kheyr Rural District, in the Central District of Darab County, Fars Province, Iran. At the 2006 census, its population was 253, in 55 families.

References 

Populated places in Darab County